Sailor's Wives is a lost 1928 silent film romantic-comedy directed by Joseph Henabery and starring Mary Astor. It was produced and distributed by First National Pictures.

Cast
Mary Astor as Carol Trent
Lloyd Hughes as Don Manning 
Earle Foxe as Max Slater
Burr McIntosh as Dr. Bobs
Ruth Dwyer as Pat Scott
Jack Mower as Carey Scott
Olive Tell as Careth Lindsey
Robert Schable as Tom Lindsey
Gayne Whitman as Warren Graves
Bess True as "Deuces Wild"

References

External links
Sailor's Wives @IMDb.com

period advertisement

1928 films
American silent feature films
Films directed by Joseph Henabery
Lost American films
First National Pictures films
American black-and-white films
1928 romantic comedy films
American romantic comedy films
Lost romantic comedy films
1928 lost films
1920s American films
Silent romantic comedy films
Silent American comedy films